Deniss Karpak (born 18 July 1986) is an Estonian sailor.

Karpak was born in Tallinn. He finished 24th at the 2008 Summer Olympics in the Laser class. At the 2012 Summer Olympics he finished 11th in the Finn class and at the 2016 Summer Olympics he finished 20th.

Biography
He was born to sailing athlete Igor Karpak and swimmer Marina Trofimova.

He began his high school education in Odessa, Ukraine. When his family moved back to Estonia, he continued his studies at Tallinna Läänemere Gümnaasium, graduating in 2004.

Karpak had his first sailing experience when he was six with an Optimist. He started to regularly engage in sailing when was 12 years old in 1998 with the sailing club "Baltsail". In 1999 Karpak moved to the sailing club Kalevi Purjespordikool (KPSK). In 2003 he moved over to the Laser class. Since 2009 he has been sailing with the Finn class.

References

External links
 

1986 births
Living people
Olympic sailors of Estonia
Estonian male sailors (sport)
Sailors at the 2008 Summer Olympics – Laser
Sailors at the 2012 Summer Olympics – Finn
Sportspeople from Tallinn
Sailors at the 2016 Summer Olympics – Finn